"Kagero" (蜉蝣) is the twenty-fourth single by the Japanese rock band Buck-Tick, released on August 2, 2006. The song was used as ending theme of the anime series xxxHolic.

Track listing

References

2006 singles
2006 songs
Buck-Tick songs
Anime songs
Ariola Japan singles
Songs with lyrics by Atsushi Sakurai
Songs with music by Hisashi Imai